Kastrat is a village in south Serbia, located in the Kuršumlija municipality, Toplica District. The cement bridge was destroyed in the NATO bombing of Yugoslavia

References

Kuršumlija